is a Japanese football manager and former player. He played for the Japan national team He is the current manager of Omiya Ardija.

Club career
Soma was born in Shizuoka on July 19, 1971. After graduating from Waseda University, he joined Kashima Antlers in 1994. He played as left-back and became one of the main player in a successful era of the club. In the 1990s, the club won several titles: the 1996 J.League, 1998 J.League, 1997 J.League Cup and 1997 Emperor's Cup. He was also selected for the Best Eleven for four years in a row (1995-1998). In 2000, the club won all three major titles in Japan: J1 League, J.League Cup and Emperor's Cup. However at Emperor's Cup in December 2000, he sustained an injury and he could not play for about a year. Although he came back in the latter half of 2001, his opportunity to play decreased behind Augusto. In 2002, he moved to Tokyo Verdy on loan. He returned to Kashima Antlers in 2003 and moved to Kawasaki Frontale in 2004. At Kawasaki Frontale, he played as defensive midfielder and sweeper. He retired at the end of the 2005 season.

International career
On May 28, 1995, Soma debuted for the Japan national team against Ecuador. After his debut, he became a regular player as left-back and left midfielder. In 1996, he played in all matches included 1996 AFC Asian Cup. In the 1998 FIFA World Cup qualification in 1997, Japan achieved qualification for 1998 FIFA World Cup first time Japan's history. He played in all matches at the 1998 World Cup. He also played at 1999 Copa America. He played 58 games and scored 4 goals for Japan until 1999.

Coaching career
Soma retired at the end of the 2005 season. After working as a TV pundit, Soma managed the Japan Football League side FC Machida Zelvia in 2010. He held a managerial post in charge of J1 League side Kawasaki Frontale prior to the 2011 season. On April 12, 2012, Kawasaki dismiss coach Naoki Soma after performing 'far below expectations'. The 40-year-old coach was sacked with the club's president stating the team were performing 'far below expectations' having aimed to win the title this term. In 2014, he signed with J3 League side FC Machida Zelvia again. He led the club to won the 2nd place in 2015 and promoted to J2 League.

Career statistics

Club

International

Scores and results list Japan's goal tally first, score column indicates score after each Soma goal.

Managerial statistics
Update; December 31, 2018

Honors
Individual
 J1 League Best Eleven: 1995, 1996, 1997, 1998
 Selected to AFC All Star Team: 1997
 J1 League Fair Play Individual: 1998

References

External links
 
 
 Japan National Football Team Database
 
 

1971 births
Living people
Waseda University alumni
Association football people from Shizuoka Prefecture
Japanese footballers
Japan international footballers
J1 League players
J2 League players
Kashima Antlers players
Tokyo Verdy players
Kawasaki Frontale players
1995 King Fahd Cup players
1996 AFC Asian Cup players
1998 FIFA World Cup players
1999 Copa América players
Japanese football managers
J1 League managers
J2 League managers
J3 League managers
FC Machida Zelvia managers
Kawasaki Frontale managers
Kashima Antlers managers
Omiya Ardija managers
Association football midfielders
Association football defenders